Warne Marsh is an album by saxophonist Warne Marsh recorded in late 1957 and early 1958 which was released on the Atlantic label.

Track listing 
 "Too Close for Comfort" (Jerry Bock, Larry Holofcener, George David Weiss) – 3:48
 "Yardbird Suite" (Charlie Parker) – 5:00
 "It's All Right With Me" (Cole Porter) – 8:14
 "My Melancholy Baby" (Ernie Burnett, George Norton) – 7:54
 "Just Squeeze Me (But Please Don't Tease Me)" (Duke Ellington, Lee Gaines) – 6:38
 "Excerpt" (Warne Marsh) – 3:32

Personnel 
Warne Marsh – tenor saxophone
Ronnie Ball – piano (tracks 1, 3)
Paul Chambers – bass
Philly Joe Jones (tracks 1, 3), Paul Motian (tracks 2, 4–6) – drums

References 

Warne Marsh albums
1958 albums
Atlantic Records albums